Glyptothek is an album by Scottish musician Momus. It was released on 5 December 2015 by independent record label American Patchwork on CD and distributed by Darla Records.

Background 
Glyptothek was recorded in Osaka, Japan. Momus began making songs for the album by working with samples from his extensive collection of old Japanese folk music. The cover is designed by Hagen Verleger. His previous album Turpsycore was published in the same year. Songs from Glyptothek and from other 2000s albums Bambi, Bibliotek, and Turpsycore were recollected in the Cherry Red Records anthology Pubic Intellectual.

Themes 
Song topics include befriending and naming a cockroach "Gregor," famous statues coming to life and taking nude selfies, fingerless chefs, and his penis.

Reception 

Yahoo! Musics Dave DiMartino ranked Glyptothek sixth on his list "Best Albums of 2015." Now Thens Zachary Freeman described the album as "combined samples of Japanese shamisen 45 records with disparate synthesisers and abrasive guitars." Zittys Thorsten Glotzmann commented on the album's composition stating "flutes, lute and drumming samples [...] clearly sound like Japan."

Frontierss Dominik Rothbard reviewed the album favorably with "Glyptothek is at once hilarious, heartbreaking and a bit scary, but sadly, it's not likely to drag him out of obscurity." Bashookas Henri Wijaya put it on the list "50 Most Awesome CD Packaging & Cover Designs."

Track listing

References

External links 

2015 albums
Momus (musician) albums